Grindavik is an impact crater in the Oxia Palus quadrangle of Mars, located at 25.39° North and 39.07° West.
Impact craters generally have a rim with ejecta around them, in contrast volcanic craters usually do not have a rim or ejecta deposits. The peak is caused by a rebound of the crater floor following the impact.

See also 
 List of craters on Mars

References 

Impact craters on Mars
Oxia Palus quadrangle